Tethea consimilis is a species of moth of the family Drepanidae first described by Warren in 1912. It is found in Asia, including the Russian Far East, Japan, Korea, Taiwan, Myanmar, Indonesia and India. The habitat consists of various types of mixed and broad-leaved forests.

The wingspan is 50–58 mm.

The larvae feed on Sorbus species and Prunus avium.

Subspecies
Tethea consimilis consimilis (south-eastern Russia, Japan, Korean Peninsula, China: Jilin, Henan, Shaanxi, Gansu, Zhejiang, Hubei, Hunan, Fujian, Guangdong, Guangxi)
Tethea consimilis aurisigna (Bryk, 1943) (Myanmar, Vietnam, Thailand, Malaysia, China: Hainan)
Tethea consimilis c-album (Matsumura, 1931) (Taiwan)
Tethea consimilis commifera (Warren, 1912) (India, Nepal, China: Sichuan, Yunnan, Tibet)
Tethea consimilis congener (Roepke, 1945) (Sumatra)

References

Moths described in 1912
Thyatirinae
Moths of Japan